Patrick Testin (born June 9, 1988) is an American Republican politician.  He is the current President pro tempore of the Wisconsin State Senate (since 2021) and has served in the Senate since 2017.  He represents the 24th Senate district, which includes the cities of Stevens Point and Wisconsin Rapids in central Wisconsin.

Biography

Born in Madison, Wisconsin, Testin graduated from Marinette High School in 2006.  He continued his education at the University of Wisconsin–Stevens Point, where he earned his bachelor's degree in political science in 2011.

While in college, Testin became actively involved with the Republican Party of Wisconsin and served as a deputy field director for the successful congressional campaign of Sean Duffy.  A few months later, he was hired as field director for Republican candidate Kim Simac in the 2011 Wisconsin Senate recall elections.  Over the next several years, after graduating from college, Testin was primarily employed as a store manager for a mattress retailer (2011–2014), and then as a sales representative for M Shiraz Wines of Wisconsin (since 2014).

In 2012, following the implementation of the 2011 Republican redistricting plan, he made his first bid for elected office, running for Wisconsin State Assembly in the open 71st Assembly district—based in Stevens Point, Plover, and neighboring parts of Portage County.  He fell far short of fellow first-time candidate Katrina Shankland, who carried 60% of the general election vote.

In 2016, Testin was again a candidate for office, challenging 13-year incumbent State Senator Julie Lassa.  This time he prevailed, taking 52% of the vote in a year when the Republican presidential candidate carried the state for the first time since 1984.  He was subsequently reelected in 2020.  Following the 2020 election, the Senate Republican caucus elected him President pro tempore for the 2021–2022 session.

In September 2021, Testin announced his candidacy for Lieutenant Governor of Wisconsin in the 2022 election. He lost the Republican primary to fellow state senator Roger Roth.

Electoral history

Wisconsin Assembly

Wisconsin Senate

References

External links
 
 
 Senator Patrick Testin at Wisconsin Legislature
 24th Senate District map (2011–2021)

|-

1988 births
21st-century American politicians
Living people
People from Stevens Point, Wisconsin
Politicians from Madison, Wisconsin
University of Wisconsin–Stevens Point alumni
Republican Party Wisconsin state senators